The Quilemba Solar Power Station is a planned  solar power plant in Angola. The power station is in the development stage, by a consortium comprising Total Eren, a subsidiary of TotalEnergies, the French oil  conglomerate, in collaboration with  Greentech-Angola Environment Technology and Sonangol, the Angolan energy parastatal.

Location

Overview
The power station is designed to have generation capacity of 35 megawatts. Its output is intended to be sold directly to the Empresa Rede Nacional de Transporte de Electricidade (RNT), the national electricity transportation utility company, for integration into the national grid, under a long-term power purchase agreement. On 30 November 2020, a memorandum of understanding (MOU) was signed by the developers of this power station and the government of Angola for the design, financing, construction and operation of Quilemba Solar Power Station, with generation capacity of 35 megawatts.

The Angolan government is in the process of expanding national electricity generation from the current (2021) 5.01 GW to 9.9 GW by 2025, of which 800 MW is sourced from renewable sources.

Developers
The table below illustrates the corporate entities who own a stake in the special purpose vehicle (SPV) company "Quilemba Solar Company":

As of April 2021, discussions are ongoing, seeking the participation of Sonangol, the national oil company of Angola, in the development consortium. In October 2021, Sonangol agreed to take a 30 percent shareholding in Quilemba Solar Company, the SPV company.

Benefits
The energy generated by this power station is expected to reduce the country's electricity deficit and to increase the proportion of the Angolan population who are connected to grid electricity.

See also

 List of power stations in Angola
 Caraculo Solar Power Station

References

External links
 Overview of Electricity Energy Sector In Angola As of December 2018.
 Sonangol, Total-Eren and Greentech Partner for Solar Project "Quilemba" As of 15 October 2021.

Solar power stations in Angola
Buildings and structures in Huíla Province
Renewable energy power stations in Angola